Doe v. Chao, 540 U.S. 614 (2004), is a decision by the United States Supreme Court that interpreted the statutory damages provision of the Privacy Act of 1974.

Prior to the case, lower federal courts had split over whether plaintiffs whose rights were violated were automatically entitled to the statutory minimum damages award of $1000, or whether those plaintiffs had to prove that they had suffered at least some actual damage from the privacy breach (which would then be raised to $1000 if their actual damages were less than that).

The Court's 6–3 decision determined that the latter interpretation was correct; as a result, it will be more difficult for a plaintiff to prevail as he or she must now prove both a violation and some damages before being entitled to recovery.

This result is generally applauded by proponents of greater freedoms for the press, as a contrary result may have made government agencies more reluctant to release information out of fear of lawsuits.

Background of the case
The plaintiff in the case, coal miner Buck Doe (a pseudonym), filed for benefits under the federal Black Lung Benefits Act. The Department of Labor, which ran the benefits program, required applicants to provide a Social Security number as a part of the application.  The government's practice was to use the number for identification purposes, and as a result, claimants such as Doe had their Social Security numbers displayed on various legal documents and published in case reports and online legal research databases.

Doe, along with six other black lung claimants, sued the Department of Labor for violating their rights under the Privacy Act.  The government conceded that it had violated the statute.  At trial, Doe testified that he suffered "distress" from the release of his private information.  The district court awarded Doe $1000, which was the statutory minimum amount of damages that could be awarded under the statute.

The Fourth Circuit reversed.  It interpreted the statute to require a plaintiff to show some actual damages before the statutory minimum damages could be awarded.  Further, it found that plaintiff's testimony about his "distress" was not legally sufficient to show that he had been damaged by the disclosure.

This decision conflicted with decisions of the First, Fifth, Ninth, Eleventh, and District of Columbia circuits, and the Supreme Court granted certiorari to resolve the dispute.

Statutory language
The statutory language at issue provided that if a government agency violated the act "in a manner which was intentional or willful, the United States shall be liable to the individual in an amount equal to the sum of actual damages sustained by the individual as a result of the refusal or failure, but in no case shall a person entitled to recovery receive less than the sum of $1,000."

Supreme Court
The Court, in an opinion written by Justice David Souter, agreed with the Fourth Circuit's interpretation as a matter of "straightforward textual analysis."

The Court supported its interpretation with an analysis of the history of the statute, which showed that Congress specifically removed language from the bill that explicitly would have awarded $1000 without proof of any damages.  (Justice Antonin Scalia, an opponent of using legislative history in interpreting statutes, did not join this paragraph of the opinion).

Dissenting opinions
Justice Ruth Bader Ginsburg wrote a dissenting opinion, arguing that a "sensible" reading of the statutory language supported Doe's position.  She also noted that reading the statute to require some proof of actual damages would have little practical effect.  She noted that it would be very easy for a plaintiff to prove actual damages in a similar case merely by purchasing a credit report following the publication of his Social Security number.  This small amount of damages would then be raised to $1000 by operation of the statute.

Justice Stephen Breyer also dissented, noting that the government's stated fear of large damage awards under a more permissive reading of the statute would likely not materialize, as courts had interpreted the statute to only permit damages where the government released private information in bad faith (as opposed to accidentally).

See also
 List of United States Supreme Court cases, volume 540
List of United States Supreme Court cases

References

External links
 

2004 in United States case law
United States Supreme Court cases
United States Supreme Court cases of the Rehnquist Court
Coal mining in the United States
Social Security lawsuits
United States privacy case law
Coal mining law